Malard and Suburbs Bus Organization is a public transport agency running Transit buses in Malard and surrounding areas in Tehran Province.

List of Routes

References

Transport in Iran
Malard County
Bus transport in Iran